Marion Ryan (4 February 1931 – 15 January 1999) was a British singer in the 1950s in the early years of British Independent Television. She was once called "the Marilyn Monroe of popular song".

Early life
Born in Middlesbrough, North Riding of Yorkshire, England, she attended Notre Dame Collegiate School for Girls in Leeds, now Notre Dame Catholic Sixth Form College.

Career
Marion Ryan was working in a hosiery shop in Leeds and she broke into show business when she approached Ray Ellington who was performing at the Locarno in Liverpool in July 1953 and asked to sing with his quartet. He allowed her to do so and the audience reaction was so good he signed her up to work with the quartet. She made her debut with them at the Locarno, Glasgow in September 1953. Her first radio appearance took place on the show "Stepping Out at Radio Roadhouse" on the Light Programme on October 27, 1953 when the Ellington quartet were the guest band. She continued to tour with Ellington until 1957 and made further radio appearances with them including the popular Goon Show.

She began recording for Pye Nixa in 1956 and mainly made cover versions of American hits. Her version of "Love Me Forever" peaked at number five on the UK Singles Chart in 1958. Her first LP "A Lady Loves" was released in 1959. Beginning in June 1956, she was the regular singer in the popular musical quiz Spot the Tune on Granada Television for seven years, with a total of 209 half-hour programmes, which featured several star hosts including disc-jockey Pete Murray, the Canadian pop singer Jackie Rae, and the comedians Ken Platt and Ted Ray, and also Peter Knight and his orchestra. The show re-emerged in the 1970s as Name That Tune.

Ryan went solo in 1957 and undertook her first variety tour and then went on tour with Cyril Stapleton and his Show Band. She made six appearances in BBC's Six-Five Special in 1957 and 1958 and she appeared in the Royal Variety Performance in 1959 Ryan appeared on Sunday Night at the London Palladium in 1963 and made one brief appearance as herself in the film It's All Happening, with singer Tommy Steele the same year. She had important guest spots on The Bob Hope Show in 1958 and The Bing Crosby Show in 1961.

Personal life
Her first marriage at the age of 17 was to Lloyd George Frederick Sapherson (known as Fred) (1913-2001) in the second quarter of 1948. They had twin sons, Barry and Paul (born Leeds, West Riding of Yorkshire, 24 October 1948). In 1969 she married the show business agent Harold Davison (1922-2011) and they had a daughter named Caroline. After which she gradually eased herself into retirement. She died from a heart attack at age 67 in Boca Raton, Florida, United States.

References

External links
 "Best Before the Beat" (Obituary in The Guardian, 17 January 1999)
 

1931 births
1999 deaths
People from Middlesbrough
20th-century English singers
English women pop singers
20th-century English women singers